"To His Coy Mistress" is a metaphysical poem written by the English author and politician Andrew Marvell (1621–1678) either during or just before the English Interregnum (1649–60). It was published posthumously in 1681.

This poem is considered one of Marvell's finest and is possibly the best recognised carpe diem poem in English. Although the date of its composition is not known, it may have been written in the early 1650s. At that time, Marvell was serving as a tutor to the daughter of the retired commander of the New Model Army, Sir Thomas Fairfax.

Synopsis
The speaker of the poem starts by addressing  a woman who has been slow to respond to his romantic advances. In the first stanza he describes how he would pay court to her if he were to be unencumbered by the constraints of a normal lifespan. He could spend centuries admiring each part of her body and her resistance to his advances (i.e., coyness) would not discourage him. In the second stanza, he laments how short human life is. Once life is over, the speaker contends, the opportunity to enjoy one another is gone, as no one embraces in death. In the last stanza, the speaker urges the woman to requite his efforts, and argues that in loving one another with passion they will both make the most of the brief time they have to live.

Structure
The poem is written in iambic tetrameter and rhymes in couplets. The first verse paragraph ("Had we...") is ten couplets long, the second ("But...") six, and the third ("Now therefore...") seven.
The logical form of the poem runs: if... but... therefore....

Critical reception and themes

Until recently, "To His Coy Mistress" had been received by many as a poem that follows the traditional conventions of carpe diem love poetry. Some modern critics, however, argue Marvell's use of complex and ambiguous metaphors challenges the perceived notions of the poem. It as well raises suspicion of irony and deludes the reader with its inappropriate and jarring imagery.

Some critics believe the poem is an ironic statement on sexual seduction. They reject the idea that Marvell's poem carries a serious and solemn mood. Rather, the poem's opening lines—"Had we but world enough, and time/ This coyness, Lady, were no crime"—seems to suggest quite a whimsical tone of regret. In the second part of the poem, there is a sudden transition into imagery that involves graves, marble vaults and worms. The narrator's use of such metaphors to depict a realistic and harsh death that awaits the lovers seems to be a way of shocking the lady into submission. As well, critics note the sense of urgency of the narrator in the poem's third section, especially the alarming comparison of the lovers to "amorous birds of prey".

Allusions in other works
At least two poets have taken up the challenge of responding to Marvell's poem in the character of the lady so addressed. Annie Finch's "Coy Mistress" suggests that poetry is a more fitting use of their time than lovemaking, while A.D. Hope's "His Coy Mistress to Mr. Marvell" turns down the offered seduction outright.

Many authors have borrowed the phrase "World enough and time" from the poem's opening line to use in their book titles. The most famous is Robert Penn Warren's 1950 novel World Enough and Time: A Romantic Novel, about murder in early-19th-century Kentucky. With variations, it has also been used for books on the philosophy of physics (World Enough and Space-Time: Absolute versus Relational Theories of Space and Time), geopolitics (World Enough and Time: Successful Strategies for Resource Management), a science-fiction collection (Worlds Enough & Time: Five Tales of Speculative Fiction), and a biography of the poet (World Enough and Time: The Life of Andrew Marvell). The phrase is used as a title chapter in Andreas Wagner's pop science book on the origin of variation in organisms, "Arrival of the Fittest". The verse serves as an epigraph to Mimesis, literary critic Erich Auerbach's most famous book. It is also the title of an episode of Big Finish Productions's The Diary of River Song series 2, and of part 1 of Doctor Who'''s Series 10 finale. It is the title of a Star Trek New Voyages fan episode where George Takei reprises his role as Sulu after being lost in a rift in time. The title of Robert A. Heinlein's 1973 novel Time Enough for Love also echoes this line.

Also in the field of science fiction, Ursula K. Le Guin wrote a Hugo-nominated short story whose title, "Vaster than Empires and More Slow", is taken from the poem. Ian Watson notes the debt of this story to  Marvell, "whose complex and allusive poems are of a later form of pastoral to that which I shall refer, and, like Marvell, Le Guin's nature references are, as I want to argue, "pastoral" in a much more fundamental and interesting way than this simplistic use of the term." There are other allusions to the poem in the field of Fantasy and Science Fiction: the first book of James Kahn's "New World Series" is titled "World Enough, and Time"; the third book of Joe Haldeman's "Worlds" trilogy is titled "Worlds Enough and Time"; and Peter S. Beagle's novel A Fine and Private Place about a love affair between two ghosts in a graveyard. The latter phrase has been widely used as a euphemism for the grave, and has formed the title of several mystery novels.

Brian Aldiss's novel Hothouse, set in a distant future in which the earth is dominated by plant life, opens with "My vegetable love should grow / vaster than empires, and more slow."

Sir Terry Pratchett opens his poem An Ode to Multiple Universes with "I do have worlds enough and time / to spare an hour to find a rhyme / to take a week to pen an article / a day to find a rhyme for ‘particle’."

The phrase "there will be time" occurs repeatedly in a section of T. S. Eliot's "The Love Song of J. Alfred Prufrock" (1915), and is often said to be an allusion to Marvell's poem. Prufrock says that there will be time "for the yellow smoke that slides along the street", time "to murder and create", and time "for a hundred indecisions ... Before the taking of a toast and tea".  As Eliot's hero is, in fact, putting off romance and consummation, he is (falsely) answering Marvell's speaker.  Eliot also alludes to the lines near the end of Marvell's poem, "Let us roll all our strength and all / Our sweetness up into one ball", with his lines, "To have squeezed the universe into a ball / To roll it toward some overwhelming question," as Prufrock questions whether or not such an act of daring would have been worth it. Eliot returns to Marvell in The Waste Land with the lines "But at my back in a cold blast I hear / The rattle of the bones" (Part III, line 185) and "But at my back from time to time I hear / The sound of horns and motors" (Part III, line 196).

The line "deserts of vast eternity" is used in the novel Orlando: A Biography, by Virginia Woolf, which was published in 1928.

Archibald MacLeish's poem "",On Becoming a Poet, from The Weather of Words, by Mark Strand alludes to the passage of time and to the growth and decline of empires. In his poem, the speaker, lying on the ground at sunset, feels "the rising of the night". He visualizes sunset, moving from east to west geographically, overtaking the great civilizations of the past, and feels "how swift how secretly / The shadow of the night comes on."

B. F. Skinner quotes "But at my back I always hear / Time's wingèd chariot hurrying near", through his character Professor Burris in Walden Two, who is in a confused mood of desperation, lack of orientation, irresolution  and indecision. (Prentice Hall 1976, Chapter 31, p. 266). This line is also quoted in Ernest Hemingway's novel A Farewell to Arms, as in Arthur C. Clarke's short story, The Ultimate Melody.

The same line appears in full in the opening minutes of Michael Powell and Emeric Pressburger's A Matter of Life and Death (1946), spoken by the protagonist, pilot and poet Peter Carter: 'But at my back I always hear / Time's wingéd chariot hurrying near; And yonder all before us lie / Deserts of vast eternity. Andy Marvell, What a marvel'.

Primo Levi roughly quotes Marvell in his 1983 poem "The Mouse," which describes the artistic and existential pressures of the awareness that time is finite. He expresses annoyance at the sentiment to seize the day, stating, "And at my back it seems to hear / Some winged curved chariot hurrying near. / What impudence! What conceit! / I really was fed up."

The line "A fine and private place, but none, I think, do there embrace" appears in Stephen King's novel Pet Sematary.

One of the Flavia de Luce novels by Alan Bradley is titled “the Grave’s a Fine and Private Place”.

The line "My vegetable love should grow / Vaster than empires, and more slow" is quoted by William S. Burroughs in the last entry of his diary (July 29, 1997).

The poem, along with Marvell's 'The Definition of Love', is heavily referenced throughout the 1997 film The Daytrippers, in which the main character finds a note she believes may be from her husband's mistress. In several scenes, the two Marvell poems are alluded to, quoted, and sometimes directly discussed.

The line "I would Love you ten years before the Flood, And you should, if you please, refuse Till the conversion of the Jews. My vegetable love should grow Vaster than empires, and more slow." Is used as the preamble to part three of Greg Bear's Nebula award winning novel Moving Mars.

In The Time Traveler's Wife, by Audrey Niffenegger, one of the main characters, Henry, recites the line "To world enough, and time," at several crucial points in the story.

"Le char ailé du Temps" (Time's winged chariot) is the French translation (by Bernard Sigaud, 2013) of a short story by Nina Allan (2009), whose original title is just "Time's Chariot".

Brian quotes the line "Had we but world enough, and time" in season 5 episode 5 of Queer as Folk.World and Time Enough'' is a 1994 independent gay-themed romantic comedy-drama written and directed by Eric Mueller.

References

External links
 "To His Coy Mistress" (text)
 

1650s poems
1681 poems
Poetry by Andrew Marvell
Poems published posthumously